Santa Bárbara (Salta) is a village and rural municipality in Cafayate Department located in Salta Province in northwestern Argentina.

References

Populated places in Salta Province